Kay Whitmore, Jr. (born April 10, 1967) is a Canadian former ice hockey goaltender. He played for the Hartford Whalers, Vancouver Canucks, Boston Bruins, and Calgary Flames during his career, as well as several teams in the minor American Hockey League and International Hockey League, from 1987 until 2002.

Hockey career
As a youth, Whitmore played in the 1979 Quebec International Pee-Wee Hockey Tournament with a minor ice hockey team from Greater Sudbury.

In 1983-84, Whitmore joined OHL's Peterborough Petes and went 17-8-0 as a major junior rookie. The following season, he paced the league with 53 games by a goalie and 35 wins. In the playoffs, he went 10-4. In 1985-86, he went 27-12-2 with a league-best three shutouts and 2.77 GAA. At year's end, he was named an OHL First Team All-Star.

Whitmore was drafted 26th overall in the 1985 Entry Draft by the Hartford Whalers.  He played most of his first four professional seasons for Hartford's minor league teams in Binghamton and Springfield, with some spot duty for the Whalers in 1989, 1990 and 1991.  In the 1991 American Hockey League season, Whitmore led the Springfield Indians to the franchise's seventh and final Calder Cup, and was named the winner of the Jack A. Butterfield Trophy as playoff MVP.

The following season, Whitmore stuck in the NHL, platooning with Peter Sidorkiewicz in the Whalers' nets but losing his job to Frank Pietrangelo at season's end and in the playoffs.

In the 1992 offseason, he was traded to the Vancouver Canucks for Corrie D'Alessio and cash. That season, he played 31 games behind Kirk McLean and helped the Canucks win the Smythe Division season title, going 18-8-4 with a 3.10 GAA. In 1994, he played 32 games and posted an 18-14-0 record. In the playoffs, he helped his team win the Clarence Campbell Bowl in the Western Conference finals before losing to the New York Rangers in the Stanley Cup finals. In the shortened 1994-95 season, Kay played eleven games for the Canucks.

His contract expiring thereafter, Whitmore spent the next five seasons in the minor leagues, his most successful season being 1998, when he led the Long Beach Ice Dogs of the International Hockey League into the league semi-finals, as well as winning First Team All-Star accolades.

Being traded to the Boston Bruins in 1999 for future considerations, he was recalled from Boston's Providence farm team in the 2000-01 season when Bruins goaltenders Byron Dafoe and John Grahame were both injured. Whitmore, getting his first NHL start in over six years, posted a 5–4 win over the Chicago Blackhawks on November 2, 2000. In five games with the Bruins, Whitmore's save percentage stood at .809, and he was sent back down to the minors. The following season Whitmore signed as a free agent with the Calgary Flames, but only played in one game for them, seeing most of his action for their American Hockey League farm team, the Saint John Flames.  He retired from professional hockey thereafter, save for a three-game playoff stint for the Nuremberg Ice Tigers of the Deutsche Eishockey Liga in 2005.

Post playing career
Following his hockey career, Whitmore was the goaltending coach for the Peterborough Petes from 2002-2004. From 2005-2006, Whitmore worked as a studio analyst on the NHL Network's program On the Fly, as well as a guest studio analyst on The NHL on OLN Post Game Report. Whitmore can also be seen as a guest analyst on the Versus Network
. Currently, Whitmore is serving as a goaltending supervisor for the NHL.

Career statistics

Regular season and playoffs

References

External links 
 

1967 births
Binghamton Whalers players
Boston Bruins players
Calgary Flames players
Canadian expatriate ice hockey players in Germany
Canadian expatriate ice hockey players in Sweden
Canadian ice hockey goaltenders
Hartford Whalers draft picks
Hartford Whalers players
Living people
Nürnberg Ice Tigers players
Ice hockey people from Ontario
Sportspeople from Greater Sudbury
Peterborough Petes (ice hockey) players
Providence Bruins players
Saint John Flames players
Södertälje SK players
Springfield Indians players
Syracuse Crunch players
Vancouver Canucks players